The Apostolic Vicariate of the Midland District (later of the Central District) was an ecclesiastical jurisdiction of the Roman Catholic Church in England and Wales. It was led by an apostolic vicar (or vicar apostolic) who was a titular bishop. The Apostolic Vicariate of the Midland District was created in 1688 and changed its name to the Central District in 1840. It was dissolved in 1850 and was replaced by two dioceses.

Background 
Soon after the accession of Anglican Tudor Queen Elizabeth I, the bishops of England were forced to choose between taking the Oath of Supremacy, thus denying the authority of the Pope, and losing their episcopal sees. Those who chose to continue their allegiance to Rome were subsequently deposed and replaced in their sees by priests of the Church of England. Most of the deposed Bishops were imprisoned in various locations and died in captivity over a period of years, though some left the country and continued their work overseas. The last of the deposed bishops was Thomas Goldwell, Bishop of St Asaph, who died in Rome on 3 April 1585.

Restoration: The Vicar Apostolic of England 
In 1623 Pope Urban VIII decided once again to appoint a bishop with jurisdiction in England. So it was that Dr William Bishop was appointed with the title of Apostolic Vicar of England. He died shortly afterwards and was succeeded by Dr Richard Smith, who in August 1631 was forced to resign and fled to France. The office then remained vacant until its revival in 1685 with the appointment of Dr John Leyburn as Apostolic Vicar.

Geographical organisation 
In 1623 the first Vicar Apostolic, Dr Bishop, divided England into six areas and placed a superior at the head of each with the title of vicar general.

This structure remained in place until Dr Leyburn reduced the number from six to four. It was on the basis of these four areas that on 20 January 1688 Pope Innocent XI increased the number of bishops in England to four, with the result that the territory of the former single Apostolic Vicariate of England and Wales was reduced, becoming the Apostolic Vicariate of the London District. So it was that the Vicariate Apostolic of the Midland District was created, along with those of the Northern and the Western (including Wales) Districts.

The first Apostolic Vicar of the Midland District, appointed with effect from 30 January 1688, was Bishop Bonaventure Giffard, who in 1703 was translated to become the Vicar Apostolic of the London District.

The Midland District consisted of the historic counties of Cambridgeshire (with the Isle of Ely), Derbyshire, Huntingdonshire, Leicestershire, Lincolnshire, Norfolk, Northamptonshire, Nottinghamshire, Oxfordshire, Rutland, Shropshire, Staffordshire, Suffolk, Warwickshire, and Worcestershire.

Notwithstanding intermittent persecution, an Apostolic Vicariate of the Midland District continued in existence until in 1840 when the existing four Vicariates were further divided. The Midland District was renamed the Central District on 3 July 1840, but it lost jurisdiction of the counties of Cambridgeshire (with the Isle of Ely), Huntingdonshire, Lincolnshire, Norfolk, Northamptonshire, and Rutland to the newly formed the Apostolic Vicariate of the Eastern District.

The Central District was to last only ten years, until on 29 September 1850, Pope Pius IX issued the Bull Universalis Ecclesiae, by which thirteen new dioceses were created, commonly known as the restoration of the English hierarchy, among them the diocese of Birmingham, which replaced formally the previous Vicariate.

The last Apostolic Vicar of the Midland District was Bishop Thomas Walsh, who from 1840 till 1847 had the new title Vicar Apostolic of the Central District.

Bishop and Archbishop of Birmingham 
Bishop Walsh was succeeded as Vicar Apostolic of the Central District by the Benedictine William Bernard Ullathorne, who on 29 September 1850 received the new title of Bishop of Birmingham. On 28 October 1911 a new ecclesiastical province was created dependent on Birmingham, and the title became that of the Metropolitan Archbishop of Birmingham.

List of Apostolic Vicars

Apostolic Vicars of the Midland District

Apostolic Vicars of the Central District

See also 

 Catholic Church by country
 Catholic Church hierarchy
 Catholic Church in England and Wales
 Lists of patriarchs, archbishops, and bishops
 Roman Catholic bishops
 Roman Catholicism in England and Wales

References

Bibliography 

 

History of Catholicism in England
Former Roman Catholic dioceses in Europe
Midland District
Apostolic vicariates
Christianity in Birmingham, West Midlands
1688 establishments in England